Pistolbuttsa'twinkle is the second album by Australian rock band Tlot Tlot. The album was released in 1992 and compiles eight remastered versions of cuts from the band's debut, A Day at the Bay, with previously unreleased songs from the sessions.

Track listing 

A music video was filmed for "Box o' Gods".

Crew 
 Stanley Paulzen - lead vocals, guitars
 Owen Bolwell - backing vocals, processed vocals, guitars, bass, drum programming, special effects, keyboards, lead vocals on track 13
 Aka Setkya - producer
 Greg Fields, Colin Mac - saxophones

Pistolbuttsatwinkle'atwinkle 

In 1993, shortly after Pistolbuttsa'twinkle was sold out and deleted, Tlot Tlot reissued the album as Pistolbuttsatwinkle'atwinkle, with new cover art and a re-ordered track list incorporating five tracks originally from Day at the Bay, but left off the original CD release.

Track listing

Legacy 
The name of the track "Sunny Delirious" would, in the 2010s, be used as the name of Sunny Delirious Pty Ltd, the company owning the trademark to Merril Bainbridge's online maternity wear store Peachymama.

Tlot Tlot are the only known pop group to write a song - "The Bonebass Suttee“ on this album - about the practice of Sati.

References

External links 
 Pistolbuttsa'twinkle at Discogs

1992 albums
Tlot Tlot albums